Arasa Kattalai is a 1967 Indian Tamil-language historical action film, written and directed by M. G. Chakrapani, starring M. G. Ramachandran and B. Saroja Devi, with Jayalalithaa, M. N. Nambiar and S. A. Ashokan in supporting roles. It was released on 19 May 1967.

Plot 

A monarch believes that he has committed a terrible fault and commits suicide to make amends, not without having indicated his successor: Vijayan, a man of the people, that one even, who had come punish him, a fearless knight, for an act of bravery. Before dying, the monarch orders Vijayan to protect his subjects and to put back the power into the hands of the people. By so acting, the deceased king had also just thwarted the Machiavellian intentions of its Minister. Indeed, this traitor intends to seize the throne. But it will be for another time, because this sinister dignitary is going to make every effort to sabotage the reforms of Vijayan. To begin with, by eliminating him.

Cast 
 M. G. Ramachandran as Vijayan
 B. Saroja Devi as Amala
 Jayalalithaa as Moghana
 S. A. Ashokan as Vilavan
 M. N. Nambiar as Amudha's guardian
 R. S. Manohar as the perfidious minister
 Nagesh as the tribal leader
 P. S. Veerappa (guest-star) as the King of the Kumari
 K. R. Ramasamy as the patriot with the flag (guest star)
 N. S. Natarajan as a tribal
 Kundumani as a rustic fellow
 Madhavi as Jambha

Production 
The film initially began under the title Bhavani, which was written by A. K. Velan and was to be directed by Masthan. M. G. Ramachandran's brother Chakrapani produced this film, which got shelved after some progress. Chakrapani later revived this film as Arasa Kattalai, with Ramachandran returning to star. Apart from directing, Chakrapani made a cameo appearance in the film. Jayalalithaa earned the title "Kavarchi Kanni" through this film.

Soundtrack 
Soundtrack was composed by K. V. Mahadevan and lyrics were written by Muthukoothan, Vaali and Alangudi Somu. The songs "Aadi Vaa" and "Vettaiyadu Vilayaadu" became chartbusters.

Release and reception 
Arasa Kattalai was released on 19 May 1967. The film ran for 10 weeks in theatres, and was not commercially successful. Kalki said the film, despite its flaws, would satisfy Ramachandran's fans.

In popular culture 
The song "Vettaiyadu Vilayadu" inspired Gautham Vasudev Menon to title his 2006 film of the same name.

References

External links 
 

1960s historical action films
1960s Tamil-language films
1967 films
Films scored by K. V. Mahadevan
Indian historical action films